Bahçeli is a village in Dikili district of İzmir Province, Turkey.  It is situated on Turkish state highway   at the Aegean Sea side . The population of the village is 607. as of 2011.

References

Villages in Dikili District